A pall (or pairle) in heraldry and vexillology is a Y-shaped charge, normally having its arms in the three corners of the shield. An example of a pall placed horizontally (fesswise) is the green portion of the South African national flag.

A pall that stops short of the shield's edges and that has pointed ends to its three limbs is called a shakefork, although some heraldic sources do not make a distinction between a pall and a shakefork. A pall standing upside down is named pall reversed.

A pall on a shield may indicate a connection with the clergy, particularly archbishoprics, although in these cases the pall's lower limb usually stops short of the bottom of the shield and is fringed. Such a pall is often called an ecclesiastical pall or pallium. This is in reference to the ecclesiastical vestment from which this heraldic charge derives.

If there is symmetry within the arms, its blazon can be simplified in the English language by use of the heraldic term 'between' -- 'in the midst of, so as to make a symmetrical composition'. The coat of Saint-Wandrille-Rançon is an example where the French blasonnement is similar to the traditional English blazon, yet can be described with a simplified English blazon.

Modified palls
A pall can be modified by most of the lines of partition, such as the pall wavy in the coat of Saint-Wandrille-Rançon.

Gallery

References

External links

Heraldic ordinaries